Protein phosphatase 1 regulatory subunit 12A is an enzyme that in humans is encoded by the PPP1R12A gene.

Myosin phosphatase target subunit 1, which is also called the myosin-binding subunit of myosin phosphatase, is one of the subunits of myosin phosphatase. Myosin phosphatase regulates the interaction of actin and myosin downstream of the guanosine triphosphatase Rho. The small guanosine triphosphatase Rho is implicated in myosin light chain (MLC) phosphorylation, which results in contraction of smooth muscle  and interaction of actin and myosin in nonmuscle cells. The guanosine triphosphate (GTP)-bound, active form of RhoA (GTP.RhoA) specifically interacted with the myosin-binding subunit (MBS) of myosin phosphatase, which regulates the extent of phosphorylation of MLC. Rho-associated kinase (Rho-kinase), which is activated by GTP. RhoA, phosphorylated MBS and consequently inactivated myosin phosphatase. Overexpression of RhoA or activated RhoA in NIH 3T3 cells increased phosphorylation of MBS and MLC. Thus, Rho appears to inhibit myosin phosphatase through the action of Rho-kinase.

Interactions
PPP1R12A has been shown to interact with Interleukin 16.

References

Further reading

External links
PPP1R12A Info with links in the Cell Migration Gateway